Gobindashi Union is a union of Bhuapur Upazila, Tangail District, Bangladesh. It is situated 35 km north of Tangail.

Demographics
According to the 2011 Bangladesh census, Gobindashi Union had 8,109 households and a population of 33,439.

The literacy rate (age 7 and over) was 46.4% (Male-49.3%, Female-43.6%).

See also
 Union Councils of Tangail District

References

Educational Institute
 Gobindashi High School
 Ruhuly High School
 Gobindashi Govt. Primary School

Geography

Climate
Gobindashi has a tropical climate. In winter, there is much less rainfall than in summer. According to Köppen and Geiger, this climate is classified as Aw. The temperature here averages 25.5 °C.

River system

Gobindashi is flanked on the west by the Jamuna River, which is over 7 kilometres wide during the rainy season.

Populated places in Dhaka Division
Populated places in Tangail District
Unions of Bhuapur Upazila